Kochenyovo is an urban-type settlement and the administrative center of Kochenyovsky District, Novosibirsk Oblast, Russia. Population:

Media 
 Kochenyovskiye Vesti is a newspaper founded in 1932. It is published once a week.

References

Notes

Sources

Urban-type settlements in Novosibirsk Oblast